Rubashkin (feminine: Rubashkina) is a Russian Jewish surname (see Рубашка). Notable people with the surname include:
 Rubashkin family, a family of American Haredi Jews
 Aaron Rubashkin, American founder and owner of the Agriprocessors meat company, and his sons:
 Moshe Rubashkin
 Sholom Rubashkin
  (1906—1975),  Soviet screenwriter, cameraman and artist 
 Eliana Rubashkyn, pharmacist, chemist, human rights activists, former stateless gender refugee

Russian-Jewish surnames